Carolyn Taylor is a Canadian actress and comedian, best known as one of the creators and stars of the sketch comedy series Baroness von Sketch Show.

An alumna of The Second City's Toronto company, she was a writer for This Hour Has 22 Minutes before launching Baroness von Sketch with her castmates Meredith MacNeill, Aurora Browne and Jennifer Whalen.

At the 5th Canadian Screen Awards in 2017, the troupe were nominated for Best Ensemble Performance in a Variety or Sketch Comedy Series, and won the award for Best Writing in a Variety or Sketch Comedy Series; at the 6th Canadian Screen Awards in 2018, the troupe won the awards in both of the same categories.

She has also had acting roles in the television series Queer as Folk, Zoe Busiek: Wild Card, Sue Thomas: F.B. Eye, Ghosts season 2, episode 4 "The Tree" as June and the films 19 Months and Portrait of a Serial Monogamist, and wrote for the television series That's So Weird! and Dan for Mayor.

She is an out lesbian.

Filmography

Film

Television

Podcast

References

External links

Canadian film actresses
Canadian television actresses
Canadian television writers
Canadian sketch comedians
Canadian Screen Award winners
Lesbian comedians
Canadian lesbian actresses
Canadian lesbian writers
Living people
Canadian women comedians
Canadian comedy writers
This Hour Has 22 Minutes
Canadian women television writers
Year of birth missing (living people)
21st-century Canadian comedians
Canadian Comedy Award winners
21st-century Canadian LGBT people
Canadian LGBT comedians
Lesbian screenwriters